Clancy is an Irish name coming from the Gaelic Mac Fhlannchaidh/Mac Fhlannchadha, meaning "Son of the red/ruddy warrior" (Mac being for sons, Ní Fhlannchaidh/Ní Fhlannchadha would be for daughters), or as a hypocorism for Clarence.

Notable people with the name include:

As a first name
 Clancy Barone (born 1963), American football coach
 Clancy Brown (born 1959), American actor and comedian
 Clancy Chassay, English journalist
 Clancy Cooper (1906–1975), American actor
 Clancy Eccles (1940–2005), Jamaican reggae singer
 Clancy Edwards (born 1955), American track and field sprinter
 Clancy Fernando (1938–1992), Sri Lankan admiral
 Clancy Hayes (1908–1972), American singer
 Clancy O'Connor (born 1982), American actor
 Clancy Pendergast (born 1967), American football coach
 Clancy Rudeforth (born 1983), Australian rules footballer
 Clancy Sigal (1926–2017), American writer
 Clancy Smyres (1922–2007), American baseball player
 Clancy Williams (1942–1986), American footballer

As a last name
 Abigail Clancy, English model
 Al Clancy, American baseball player
 Bobby Clancy, Irish folk musician, one of the Clancy Brothers
 Boetius Clancy, Irish MP
 Claire Clancy, Chief Executive and Clerk to the National Assembly for Wales, and first woman to be Registrar of Companies for England and Wales
 Conor Clancy (Clare hurler) (born 1971), Irish hurler
 Conor Clancy (Offaly hurler) (born 1993), Irish hurler
 Cummin Clancy (1922–2013), Irish discus thrower
 Daniel J. Clancy, American computer scientist
 Dara Clancy, Irish musician, frontman of Soundstrand
 Dave Clancy, British ice hockey player
 Donald D. Clancy, American politician
 Edward Clancy (disambiguation), several people
 Finbarr Clancy, Irish folk musician, member of the High Kings
 Frank Willey Clancy, American lawyer and politician
 George Clancy (politician), Irish teacher and politician
 George Clancy (rugby union), Irish rugby union referee
 Gil Clancy (1922–2011), American boxing trainer and commentator
 Gordon Drummond Clancy, Canadian politician
 Jack Clancy, American football player
 James Clancy (disambiguation), several people
 Jim Clancy (baseball player), American baseball player
 Jim Clancy (journalist), American broadcast journalist
 Joe Clancy, American football player
 John Clancy (disambiguation), several people
 Joseph Clancy (Wisconsin), American politician
 J. J. Clancy (MP), Irish member of the British Parliament
 Kendrick Clancy, American football player
Kevin Clancy, Scottish football referee
Kevin Clancy (Royal Mint), British numismatist
 King Clancy, Canadian ice hockey defenceman
 Laurence Clancy, British aerodynamicist, academic and author
 Liam Clancy (1935–2009), Irish folk musician, one of the Clancy Brothers
 Matthew Clancy, Irish Gaelic footballer
 Michael Clancy, Governor and Commander-in-Chief of St. Helena and Dependencies, husband of Claire Clancy
 Michael Martin Clancy, Irish catholic priest in Australia
 Natalie Clancy, Canadian journalist
 Patrick Clancy, Irish folk musician, one of the Clancy Brothers
 Patrick Clancy (Irish politician), Irish politician for Limerick
 Patty Clancy, American politician
 Pauric Clancy, Irish Gaelic football player
 Peadar Clancy, member of the Irish Republican Army
 Robert H. Clancy, American Representative from Michigan (1923–25, 1927–33)
 Professor Robert Clancy, Australian scientist
 Sam Clancy, American football and basketball player
 Sam Clancy Jr., American basketball player, son of the above
 Seán Clancy, member of the Irish Volunteers
 Sean Clancy (disambiguation), several people
 Susan Clancy, American psychologist and ufologist
 T. Frank Clancy, American politician
 Taliqua Clancy (born 1992), Australian beach volleyball player
 Thomas Owen Clancy, American historian
 Tim Clancy, Irish footballer
 Tom Clancy (1947–2013), American author
 Tom Clancy (singer), Irish folk musician, one of the Clancy Brothers
 William Clancy, Irish missionary
 Willie Clancy (musician), Irish Uilleann pipes player
 Willie Clancy (hurler), Irish hurler

Fictional characters
 Kanuka Clancy, one of the main characters from the anime series Mobile Police Patlabor
 Chief Wiggum, Clancy Wiggum, character on The Simpsons
 Clancy Freeman, a recurring character in Blue Heelers
 Clancy, the protagonist in US-band Twenty One Pilots's fifth studio album Trench
 Clancy of the Overflow, the titular character in a Banjo Paterson poem, possibly based on Australian drover Thomas Gerald Clancy

See also
 Clancey

References

Surnames of Irish origin
Anglicised Irish-language surnames
Irish families
Septs of the Dál gCais